RSI La 2 (RSI La due) is a Swiss public television channel owned by Radiotelevisione Svizzera di lingua Italiana. It is a sister channel of RSI La 1, broadcast in Italian. It mainly airs sport programmes, but also reruns and music shows. It does not broadcast any newscasts.

History 
TSI launched its second channel in 1997, basing it on programming for a younger audience and sports. Unlike RSI La 1, RSI La 2 is not broadcast across the whole of Switzerland, but only in the Italian-speaking Switzerland.

The channel interrupted analogue broadcasts on 24 July 2006, from that date being available only on digital terrestrial television, satellite and cable. It was the first channel of the SRG SSR network to make the transition.

Logos

Programmes

Information
 L'Agenda

Sport
 La domenica sportiva
 SportnonStop

Live sporting events:
 Olympic Games
 FIA Formula One World Championship
 FIFA World Cup
 Premier League
 UEFA Champions League
 UEFA Europa League
 UEFA Super Cup
 Swiss Football League
 Hockey World Cup
 Ice hockey Swiss championship
 FIM MotoGP World Championship
 Cycle races
 Motorcycle racing
 Alpine skiing World Cup
Tennis:
 Australia Open
 Davis Cup
 Internationaux de France de Roland-Garros
 Wimbledon
 US Open

See also
 List of Italian-language television channels

References

External links
Official website

Television stations in Switzerland
Television channels and stations established in 1997
Italian-language television stations in Switzerland